The Pentax *ist DL is a 2005 entry-level digital single lens-reflex camera manufactured by Pentax.

Pentax *ist DL2
Introduced in 2006, the Pentax *ist DL2 is a minor upgrade to the original model Pentax *ist DL. It was available only in selected markets. This camera was co-developed with Samsung, which sold a rebadged version as the Samsung GX 1L, which was bundled with a Schneider Kreutznach-branded Pentax DA 18-55mm lens.

References

 Pentax *ist DL Camera Manual
 Pentax *ist DL2 Camera Manual

External links

 Pentax Ist-Dl-Slr Review: Overview at Steve's Digicams
 Pentax *ist DL2 Digital SLR review at Trusted Reviews

ist DL
Pentax K-mount cameras